Supamas Sangchan (born 2 April 1996) is a Thai professional golfer playing on the China LPGA Tour. As an amateur, she won a gold medal at the 2014 Asian Games in the women's team event with Budsabakorn Sukapan and Benyapa Niphatsophon and another bronze medal in the women's individual event. In 2016, Sangchan captured her first Ladies European Tour title at the Sanya Ladies Open in China.

Early life and amateur career 
Sangchan was born on 2 April 1996 in Sukhothai, Thailand. She started playing golf at the age of eight.

Sangchan competed at the 2014 Asian Games in Incheon and won the first ever gold medal in golf for Thailand in the women's team event with Budsabakorn Sukapan and Benyapa Niphatsophon. She also won a bronze medal in the women's individual event.

At the 2014 Summer Youth Olympics in Nanjing, Sangchan won a bronze medal in the women's individual event.

Professional career 
Sangchan turned professional in 2015 and participated in the China LPGA Tour in the same year. On 30 October 2016, Sangchan captured her first Ladies European Tour title at the Sanya Ladies Open in Sanya, China. With this victory, she won the qualifications to two major championships, the Women's British Open and the Evian Championship.

Supamas was in the top three of the China LPGA Tour Order of Merit for three consecutive years from 2016 to 2018 and was awarded entries into the U.S. Women's Open. She made the cut at the 2017 U.S. Women's Open and finished with a tied for 58th place.

Amateur wins 
2013 Students of Thailand Championship, Queen Sirikit Cup, Philippine Junior Championship
2014 Philippine Ladies Open

Source:

Professional wins (6)

Ladies European Tour wins (1) 

^Co-sanctioned by the Ladies Asian Golf Tour and the China LPGA Tour

China LPGA Tour wins (2) 
2016 Sanya Ladies Open
2017 EFG Hong Kong Ladies Open

Taiwan LPGA Tour wins (2) 
2017 EFG Hong Kong Ladies Open^
2018 Hitachi Ladies Classic
^Co-sanctioned by the Ladies Asian Golf Tour and the China LPGA Tour

Thai LPGA Tour wins (2) 
2015 6th Singha-SAT Thai LPGA Championship
2019 1st Singha-SAT Thai LPGA Championship

All Thailand Golf Tour wins (1)
2014 Singha Championship (as an amateur)

Results in LPGA majors 
Results not in chronological order.

CUT = missed the half-way cut
"T" = tied

Team appearances
Espirito Santo Trophy (representing Thailand): 2012

References

External links 
 

Supamas Sangchan
Supamas Sangchan
Supamas Sangchan
Asian Games medalists in golf
Medalists at the 2014 Asian Games
Golfers at the 2014 Asian Games
Golfers at the 2014 Summer Youth Olympics
Supamas Sangchan
Southeast Asian Games medalists in golf
Competitors at the 2013 Southeast Asian Games
Supamas Sangchan
1996 births
Living people
Supamas Sangchan